Panienka z poste restante is a 1935 Polish romantic comedy film directed by Jan Nowina-Przybylski and Michał Waszyński.

Cast

Alma Kar ...  Marysia Kochańska 
Aleksander Żabczyński ...  Adam Olszewicz 
Michał Znicz ...  Mr. Smith 
Mieczysława Ćwiklińska ...  Mrs. Smith 
Władysław Walter ...  Dobrzyński 
Romuald Gierasieński ...  Kontroler 
Bazyli Sikiewicz ...  Angersol 
Stefan Gulanicki ...  'Jean' Krawczuk (as Stefan Gucki)

References

External links 
 

1935 films
1930s Polish-language films
Polish black-and-white films
Films directed by Michał Waszyński
1935 romantic comedy films
Polish romantic comedy films